Nawrot is a surname. Notable people with the surname include:

Czesław Nawrot (1942–2019), Polish rower
Józef Nawrot (1906–1982), Polish footballer
Piotr Nawrot (born 1955), Polish Roman Catholic priest and musicologist

See also
 
 Návrat, a Czech-language cognate

Polish-language surnames